Simon Cellan Jones (born January 1963) is a British television director and film director.

Career
Simon Cellan Jones began his career as a production assistant in the mid-1980s, working on series such as Edge of Darkness. By the late 1980s he had worked his way up to become a director, and he gained credits on some of the most acclaimed British television productions of the 1990s. These included episodes of Cracker (1993) and Our Friends in the North (1996).

He was nominated as the Best Newcomer at the British Academy Film Awards for his first feature film Some Voices (2000). Other television credits have included BBC One's Sherlock Holmes and the Case of the Silk Stocking (2004) and More4's The Trial of Tony Blair (2007).

Personal life
Simon is the son of fellow director James Cellan Jones, and the half-brother of BBC News journalist Rory Cellan-Jones.

He married Sarah Jane O'Brien in 1986; they later divorced. He married Elizabeth Starling Gifford in 2003.

Filmography

Feature films
 Some Voices (2000)
 The One and Only (2002)
 Arthur the King (TBA)
 The Family Plan (TBA)

Television
Asst. floor manager on several editions of Howards' Way in 1985.

 The Bill (1989) (1 episode)
 Streetwise (1989)
 Medics (1992) (2 episodes)
 Cracker (1993) (1 episode)
 The Big One (1995)
 Our Friends in the North (1996) (episodes 3, 6–9)
 In Your Dreams (1997)
 Storm Damage (2000)
 Eroica (2003) — won Prix Italia for Performing Arts in 2004
 Sherlock Holmes and the Case of the Silk Stocking (2004)
 The Queen's Sister (2005)
 Coup! (2006)
 The Trial of Tony Blair (2007)
 Generation Kill (2008)
 Paradox (2009)
 On Expenses (2010)
 Treme (2010)
 Boardwalk Empire (2010) (episode 10)
 The Borgias (2011)
 Klondike (2014)
 Jessica Jones (2015)
 Shooter (2016)
The Tap (2017)
The Expanse – episode, "Abaddon's Gate" (2018)
Ballers (2015-2018)
Years and Years (2019)
See – Season 2 Episode 01, "Brothers and Sisters" (2021)

References

External links

Simon Cellan Jones in Contemporary British and Irish Film Directors: A Wallflower Critical Guide, by Yoram Allon, Del Cullen, Hannah Patterson. Wallflower Press, 2001. p. 53.

Living people
1963 births
English television directors
English film directors
Prix Italia winners
Date of birth missing (living people)
Place of birth missing (living people)
English people of Welsh descent